Alexander William Hall (20 June 1838 – 29 April 1919) was an English Conservative politician.

Hall was the son of Henry Hall and his wife Catherine Louisa Hood, daughter of Lord Bridport. He was educated at Exeter College, Oxford. In 1862 he inherited the estate of Barton Abbey Steeple Aston. He was J.P., Deputy Lieutenant and High Sheriff of Oxfordshire in 1867.

Hall was elected Member of Parliament for Oxford in 1874. He lost the seat in 1880, but stood again at a by-election later that year. The election was hard-fought and his candidature enthusiastically supported by A. E. Housman but there were irregularities in the conduct of the election. Hall was unseated and the seat was left vacant until 1885. In 1885 Hall won the seat again and held it until 1892.

Hall married Emma Gertrude Jowett and had several children.

References

External links 
 

1838 births
1919 deaths
Alumni of Exeter College, Oxford
Conservative Party (UK) MPs for English constituencies
UK MPs 1874–1880
UK MPs 1880–1885
UK MPs 1885–1886
UK MPs 1886–1892
High Sheriffs of Oxfordshire